Sekolah Menengah Poi Lam (SUWA), known as Poi Lam High School, is a Chinese school located in Ipoh, Perak, Malaysia.

Buildings and structures in Ipoh
Schools in Perak